Leath Correctional Institution (LCIW) is a South Carolina Department of Corrections prison for women located in unincorporated Greenwood County, South Carolina, near Greenwood. Leath opened in 1991. It is located just east of the Greenwood County Airport.

The prison, on a  plot of land, has a capacity of 968.

History
The prison opened in September 1991.

In the early 1990s a company called Third Generation contracted the manufacture of women's underwear to 35 Leath prisoners. These prisoners produced about $1.5 million worth of clothing. J.C. Penney, Victoria's Secret, and other companies bought this underwear for resale. This was revealed in a 1995 National Institute for Justice study. The contract was terminated by the mid-1990s.

The prison's Braille Production Center, in which inmates make braille materials for schoolchildren, opened in 2002.

The current chapel was dedicated on February 21, 2013.

Demographics
 the prison has 105 corrections officers and 40 non-security personnel, as well as 562 prisoners.

Notable inmates
Susan Smith

See also 

List of SCDC prisons

References 

Openings and Closings of South Carolina Prisons

External links
Leath Correctional Institution Website
South Carolina Department of Corrections

Buildings and structures in Greenwood County, South Carolina
Women's prisons in the United States
State prisons in South Carolina
1991 establishments in South Carolina
History of women in South Carolina